Tredington may refer to:

Tredington, Gloucestershire
Tredington, Warwickshire, formerly in Worcestershire